Mickaël Franck Poté (born 24 September 1984) is a Beninese professional footballer who plays as a forward for Turkish club Bandırmaspor.

Club career
Born in Lyon, Poté began his career in 2003 with Grenoble Foot, where he played only three games in his first season. After the season, he signed a contract with Cannes, where he stayed three years, playing fifty-one games and scoring nine goals. In the summer of 2007, he joined Clermont Foot, where he played thirty-six games in his first season, scoring five goals. In the spring of 2009, there were rumours that he might be transferred to Strasbourg or Havre, but neither transfer occurred. On 26 June 2009, he signed a three-year-contract with Ligue 1 side Nice. On 2 January 2011, he joined Ligue 2 side Le Mans on a six-month loan deal. On August 2011, he left France and signed a three-year contract with 2. Bundesliga club Dynamo Dresden. In 2014, Poté moved to Omonia, where he was Cypriot's League top scorer with 17 goals in a season. In the 2015–16 season, he played for Adana Demirspor at Turkish 1st Division and won the top scorer title with his 20 goals.

International career
Although Poté was born in France, he was eligible to represent the Ivory Coast, due to his father's roots. Instead, he chose to play for Benin, his mother's country. His debut game was on 7 September 2008, against Angola.

He played at 2019 Africa Cup of Nations where the team reached the quarter-finals

Career statistics

International

International goals
Scores and results list Benin's goal tally first.

References

External links
 
 
 Mickaël Poté at foot-national.com 
 
 

1984 births
Living people
Footballers from Lyon
Citizens of Benin through descent
Beninese footballers
French footballers
French sportspeople of Beninese descent
French sportspeople of Ivorian descent
Beninese people of Ivorian descent
Association football forwards
Benin international footballers
2010 Africa Cup of Nations players
2019 Africa Cup of Nations players
Grenoble Foot 38 players
AS Cannes players
Clermont Foot players
OGC Nice players
Le Mans FC players
Dynamo Dresden players
AC Omonia players
Adana Demirspor footballers
APOEL FC players
Ligue 1 players
Ligue 2 players
2. Bundesliga players
TFF First League players
Cypriot First Division players
Beninese expatriate footballers
Expatriate footballers in Germany
Expatriate footballers in Cyprus
Expatriate footballers in Turkey
Black French sportspeople